Fuyu Kyrgyz (Fuyü Gïrgïs, Fu-Yu Kirgiz), also known as Manchurian Kirghiz, is a Turkic language, and as , Gïrgïs, Kyrgysdar is an ethnonym of the Turkic unrecognized ethnic group in China. Despite the name, the Fuyu Kyrgyz language is not closely related to the Kyrgyz language, which is of Kipchak origin. The Fuyu Kyrgyz language is more similar to the Yughur language and the Abakan Turkic languages. The people originated in the Yenisei region of Siberia but were relocated into Dzungaria by the Dzungars.

In 1761, after the Dzungars were defeated by the Qing, a group of Yenisei Kirghiz were deported (along with some Öelet or Oirat-speaking Dzungars) to the Nonni (Nen) river basin in Manchuria/Northeast China. The Kyrgyz in Manchuria became known as the Fuyu Kyrgyz, but many have become merged into the Mongol and Chinese population. Chinese and Oirat replaced Oirat and Kirghiz during the period of Manchukuo as the dual languages of the Nonni-based Kyrgyz.

The Fuyu Kyrgyz language is now spoken in northeastern China's Heilongjiang province, in and around Fuyu County, Qiqihar (300 km northwest of Harbin) by a small number of passive speakers who are classified as Kyrgyz nationality. Fuyu County as a whole has 1,400 Fuyu Kyrgyz people.

Sounds
Although a complete phonemic analysis of Girgis has not been done, Hu and Imart have made numerous observations about the sound system in their tentative description of the language. They describe Girgis as having the short vowels noted as "a, ï, i, o, ö, u, ü" which correspond roughly to IPA , with minimal rounding and tendency towards centralization. Vowel length is phonemic and occurs as a result of consonant-deletion (Girgis  vs. Kyrgyz  'today'). Girgis displays vowel harmony as well as consonant harmony.

A song in the Fuyu Kyrgyz language

Speakers

In 1980, Fuyu Girgis was spoken by a majority of adults in a community of around a hundred homes.  However, many adults in the area have switched to speaking a local variety of Mongolian, and children have switched to Chinese as taught in the education system.

See also
Kyrgyz in China

References

Works cited

 
 
 
 
 
 
 
 
 

Agglutinative languages
Siberian Turkic languages
Languages of China
Endangered Turkic languages
Turkic peoples of Asia
Ethnic groups in China